Richard Gwyn (c. 1537–1584) was a Welsh schoolteacher and Catholic martyr and saint.

Richard Gwyn may also refer to:
Richard Gwyn (Canadian writer) (1934–2020), Canadian journalist, author and historian
Richard Gwyn (Welsh writer) (born 1956), Welsh novelist, essayist and poet

See also
St Richard Gwyn Roman Catholic High School (disambiguation)
Richard Gwynn, Welsh Anglican priest in the 17th century